SpaceCamp is a 1986 American science fiction adventure film inspired by the U.S. Space Camp in Huntsville, Alabama. Directed by Harry Winer, story by Patrick Bailey and Larry B. Williams, screenplay by Clifford Green (as W. W. Wicket) and Casey T. Mitchell, the film stars Kate Capshaw, Kelly Preston, Larry B. Scott, Lea Thompson, Tate Donovan, and Leaf Phoenix.

SpaceCamp received mixed reviews and is famous for being a "marketing nightmare," as it was released less than five months after the Space Shuttle Challenger accident of January 28, 1986 (although filming was completed before the disaster occurred). At the time of release, some thought the movie was trying to capitalize on the shuttle tragedy and should never have been released. However, those associated with SpaceCamp disagreed and added they had taken extra care to avoid any appearance of exploiting a national tragedy.

The film performed poorly at the box office, grossing less than $10 million in the US. The script was later adapted into a novel, which did include references to the Challenger explosion and some of the kids' decisions to attend Space Camp in the wake of said tragedy.

Plot 
Four teenagers - Kathryn, Kevin, Rudy, and Tish - and 12-year-old Max go to Space Camp at Kennedy Space Center near Cape Canaveral, Florida for three weeks during the summer to learn about the NASA space program and mimic Astronaut training. They meet their instructor Andie Bergstrom, a NASA-trained astronaut who is frustrated that she has not yet been assigned to a Space Shuttle mission.  Her bitterness is compounded by the fact that her husband, camp director Zach Bergstrom, is an astronaut who has walked on the Moon.

Max befriends a robot named Jinx, which was deemed unsuitable for space work because it overheated and was overly literal.  Max and the robot declare themselves to be "friends forever". Kathryn declares her dream to become the first female Shuttle commander, and is frustrated when Andie assigns that role to Kevin instead to teach him responsibility. Kevin pursues Kathryn romantically, Rudy shares his wish to open the first Fast food franchise on the Moon and Tish reveals that despite appearing to be a Valley girl, she is a genius with a photographic memory.

Kathryn and Kevin sneak away for some romance near the Launch pad, but Jinx unintentionally gives them away when Andie and Zach discover they are missing. During a confrontation, Andie explains that she believes Kathryn has what it takes to accomplish her ambition, and explains the necessity of the harsh treatment Andie is giving her. While Kathryn vows to improve her performance, Zach's conversation with Kevin is less successful.

Kevin takes out his anger on Max. Upset, Max states "...I wish I was in space". Jinx overhears and takes what Max said literally. The campers are allowed to sit in the Space Shuttle Atlantis during a routine Engine test. Jinx secretly enters NASA's computer room and triggers a "thermal curtain failure", causing one of the boosters to ignite during the test. In order to avoid a crash, Launch Control is forced to ignite the second booster and launch the Shuttle.

The Shuttle is not flight ready, has no long range radio and insufficient on-board oxygen to last to the re-entry window at Edwards Air Force Base. Andie takes the Shuttle to the partially constructed Space Station Daedalus to retrieve oxygen stored there. Realizing that while they have no voice communications with NASA they do have telemetry, Tish begins using a switch to send a Morse code signal to NASA, but it is not noticed by ground control.

Andie is slightly too big to reach the oxygen cylinders, so Max suits up for an EVA. During a critical moment, Max begins to panic until Kevin, knowing that Max is a fan of Star Wars, begins calling him "Luke", and tells him to "use the Force", which calms him enough to complete the mission, allowing Max and Andie to retrieve the containers.

In the Shuttle, Rudy attempts to decipher the technical schematics to work out how to feed the oxygen into the Shuttle's tanks. His lack of confidence combined with the time pressure frustrates Kathryn, who tries reading the diagram herself and gives Andie instructions that conflict with Rudy's. Andie follows Rudy's correct instructions. Kathryn's self-confidence is shaken as she realizes her interference nearly caused disaster.

The second oxygen tank malfunctions, injuring Andie. Unaware of this, Ground Control begins the autopilot sequence to land the Shuttle – closing the bay doors and stranding Andie outside.  Andie regains consciousness and urges them to leave her and take the re-entry window, as the Shuttle does not have enough oxygen to make the next window. Kathryn is unable to make a decision, but Kevin shows himself to be the Shuttle Commander and overrides the autopilot, enabling Max to rescue Andie. Having missed the Edwards re-entry window, the crew comes up with a plan to land at White Sands, New Mexico after Rudy recalls the 1982 Space Shuttle mission that landed there. Armed with this news, Tish uses Morse Code to signal NASA to let them land there.

At Ground Control, Jinx brings the signal to Zach's attention and they prepare for the White Sands landing.  With Andie injured, Kathryn fulfils her role as Shuttle Pilot, but frets and doubts her abilities until Kevin cajoles and teases her into guiding Atlantis through re-entry and landing it at White Sands.

Cast 
 Kate Capshaw as Andie Bergstrom, a camp instructor and astronaut.
 Tom Skerritt as Zach Bergstrom, the camp director, "flown" astronaut, and Andie's husband.
 Lea Thompson as Kathryn Fairly, who idolizes Andie and wants to be the first female shuttle commander. However, she is assigned the Pilot role.
 Tate Donovan as Kevin Donaldson. Kevin is initially arrogant and selfish until Andie assigns him the role of Commander to teach him responsibility, much to Kathryn's dismay.
 Larry B. Scott as Rudy Tyler. Rudy loves science, but admits he is sometimes not very good at it.
 Kelly Preston as Tish Ambrosé. In many ways a typical Valley girl teenager, Tish is also highly intelligent and has an eidetic memory.
 Leaf Phoenix as Max Graham, an eager 12-year-old boy who has been to Junior Camp twice, whom Andie finally allows to stay at the main camp. He frequently makes references to Star Wars.
 Frank Welker as the voice of Jinx, a sentient robot who befriends Max. Jinx facilitates the group's launch into space and then helps rescue them by discovering Tish's telemetry in Morse code. Jinx takes everything literally.

Production 
The film was made in the summer of 1985 and was the last film made by ABC Motion Pictures which was closed down in October 1985.

The film was the feature film directorial debut of Harry Winer.

Lea Thompson mentioned in an interview that after their first day of shooting, they were ten days behind schedule and what was supposed to be a three-month shoot became six. She also mentioned that "We had T-shirts printed up that said, 'SpaceCamp: It's Not Just A Movie, It's A Career.' Oh, actually, instead of SpaceCamp, it said SpaceCramp."

Music

Release
SpaceCamp was released in theaters on June 6, 1986.

Home media
It was released on DVD on September 25, 2001 and later re-released in 2006. On September 26, 2017, Kino Classics released the film on Blu-Ray.

Reception 
SpaceCamp received mixed reviews with 46% of critics giving it positive reviews on Rotten Tomatoes, based on 13 reviews. Critic Roger Ebert gave it a one and half star rating, saying that "Our thoughts about the Space Shuttle will never be the same again, and our memories are so painful that SpaceCamp is doomed even before it begins."  Variety says that "SpaceCamp never successfully integrates summer camp hijinks with outer space idealism to come up with a dramatically compelling story", while James Sanford of the Kalamazoo Gazette responds "Not exactly out of this world". Website At-A-Glance gave the film an even worse review, "It's tough to accept this movie's premise. A bunch of kids are given a tour of the Space Shuttle as NASA is testing its engines. An accident happens, and they, along with their guide, are launched into space. Once up there, can they be talked back down? Add an annoying, seemingly sentient robot into the mix. Add the standard 'two dimensional character development' arc, where each member of the cast overcomes his or her single character trait/flaw by the end of the story. Add gobs of sap, gushiness, and boredom. Mix well, and you've got a first-class mess."

In a 2012 interview with The A.V. Club, Lea Thompson mentioned that "I've had a lot of people come up to me and say that they became physicists or inventors, how much they loved that movie and how much it inspired them."

In 2016, in honor of the 30th anniversary of SpaceCamp's release, U.S. Space & Rocket Center inducted the film’s cast into the Space Camp Hall of Fame.

Remake 
In January 2020, Disney announced that a remake was in the works for their streaming service, Disney+. Mikey Day and Streeter Seidell have signed on to write the script and it will be produced by Walt Disney Pictures.

See also 
 List of films featuring space stations
 The Astronauts, a similarly themed television series, by Nickelodeon about a group of children sent into space.

References

External links 
  at MGM.com
 
 
 
 
 
 

1986 films
1980s adventure films
20th Century Fox films
ABC Motion Pictures films
American coming-of-age films
American space adventure films
American robot films
Films about astronauts
Films directed by Harry Winer
Films shot at the U.S. Space & Rocket Center
Space Shuttle Challenger disaster
Films scored by John Williams
1980s English-language films
1980s American films